Charles Osgood (born 1933) is an American writer and commentator.

Charles Osgood may also refer to:

Charles E. Osgood (1916–1991), American psychologist 
Charles Osgood (artist) (1809–1890), American painter
Charlie Osgood (1926–2014), Major League Baseball pitcher